Haijian 15 is a China Marine Surveillance (CMS) ship in the 1st Marine Surveillance Flotilla of its North China Sea Fleet. She is the first ship of the second building plan that includes seven new CMS ships. Haijian 15 was christened and commissioned on January 6, 2011 at her home port of Qingdao. Haijian 15 has been frequently conducting cruise operations in disputed waters around the Senkaku Islands. In 2012 alone, Haijian 15 has been deployed to waters around the Diaoyu Islands four times, for 103 days in total. She once sailed to a position that is 1.55 nm away from the main island, Diaoyu Island, and personnel on board raised China's national flag to assert China's claim of sovereignty over the Diaoyu Islands.

Haijian 15 was renamed CCG-1115 under the newly established China Coast Guard.

Cruise operations 
CCG-1115 has been frequently engaged in law enforcement patrol operations in waters around the Senkaku Islands.

References

Ships of the China Marine Surveillance